Cascade is a former town in Putnam County, in the U.S. state of Ohio. The GNIS classifies it as a populated place.

History
Cascade was platted in 1892. A post office was established at Cascade in 1893, and remained in operation until 1904. A large gristmill operated there, but after the mill closed there was little else to mark the site of the former community.

References

Unincorporated communities in Putnam County, Ohio
Unincorporated communities in Ohio